A creed, in Latin credo, is a statement of belief, especially of a religious nature

Credo or CREDO may also refer to:
Nicene Creed
Apostles' Creed

Film
 Credo (1997 film)
 Credo: John Paul II, a 2006 documentary
 Credo (2008 film)

Literature
 Credo (novel), a 1996 novel by Melvyn Bragg
 Credo Reference or Credo, an online library of reference books
 Credo: Historical and Theological Guide to Creeds and Confessions of Faith in the Christian Tradition, a book by Jaroslav Pelikan
 Credo, a play by Craig Lucas
 Credo, a book on the Apostles' Creed by Hans Küng, Swiss Theologian

Music
 Credo (music), a movement in a traditional musical setting of the Mass
 Credo (Penderecki), a composition by Krzysztof Penderecki
 Credo (Vivaldi), a choral composition by Antonio Vivaldi
 Credo for chorus, orchestra, and piano solo by Arvo Pärt.
 Credo (Carola album) (2004)
 Credo (The Human League album) (2011)
 Credo (Jennifer Rush album) (1997)
 Credo (MacMillan), by James MacMillan (2012)
 Credo (Pärt), by Arvo Pärt (1968)

Other topics
 Credo (card game), a 1993 card game
 CREDO (company), a mobile phone company
 21423 Credo, a main-belt asteroid
 , research organization in France
 Cosmic-Ray Extremely Distributed Observatory, a scientific project in Krakow, Poland
 Credo knife, a callus shaver
 Credo Reference, an American information company
 Credo Station, a pastoral lease in Western Australia
 John Creasey (1908-1973), an English writer whose pseudonyms include "Credo"

People with the name
 Vusamazulu Credo Mutwa (born 1921), South African writer

See also
 Credi
 Creed (disambiguation)